"Think It Over" is a song by American recording gospel/soul singer Cissy Houston and is the lead single from her 1978 third studio album Think It Over.  The disco track was written by Houston, along with, Michael Zager and Alvin Fields.  "Think It Over" was produced by Zager and peaked at #5 on the disco charts, as well as #32 on the Hot Soul Singles chart.

Track listings and formats 
US 12" Vinyl single
A "Think It Over" – 6:19
B "An Umbrella Song" – 5:56
UK 7" Vinyl single
A "Think It Over" – 3:21
B "An Umbrella Song" – 2:58

Credits and personnel
Lead vocals, background vocals – Cissy Houston, Whitney Houston 
Executive Producer – Jerry Love
Producer – Michael Zager
Written-By – Alvin Fields, Cissy Houston (tracks: A), Michael Zager

Cover versions
In 2000, Jennifer Holliday covered the song which went to No. 1 on the Billboard Hot Dance Club Play chart.

Charts

See also
 List of number-one dance singles of 2000 (U.S.)

References

1978 in music
1978 singles
2000 singles
Disco songs
Cissy Houston songs
Songs written by Michael Zager
1978 songs